Monkey3 is a psychedelic stoner rock band from Switzerland.

History
Native to Lausanne, Monkey3 was created in 2001, initially as a gathering of musicians in jam sessions of stoner rock influence. In 2003 they became a permanent group featuring Kevin on bass, Walter on drums, Boris on guitar, dB on keyboards. With their debut album "Monkey3", released in 2004 by Belgian label Buzzville Records, the band got great reactions and reviews all over Europe, putting them on the map of the stoner-rock scene.

Over their career, MONKEY3 have released 6 albums. The band's 6th full-length record, "Sphere", was released on April 12, 2019. Over the years, the Swiss quartet has toured in Europe, supporting bigger acts and playing festivals such as Roadburn,  Hellfest, Freak Valley, Desertfest Berlin and Desertfest Antwerp.

Discography
 Monkey3 (March 2003)
 39 Laps (November 2006)
 Undercover - EP (October 2009)
 Beyond the Black Sky (May 2011)
 The 5th Sun (October 2013)
 Astra Symmetry (September 2016) GER #93, SWI #61
 Live At Freak Valley - Live Album (June 2017)
 Sphere (April 2019) GER #88

Videography
 Live in Aventicum (2009, DVD)
 Birth of Venus (2013, music video)
 Moon (2016, music video)
 Mass (feat. Bumblefoot) (2019, art video)

References

External links

Swiss rock music groups
Napalm Records artists
Swiss stoner rock musical groups
Musical groups established in 2001